Garhi Pukhta is a town and a nagar panchayat in Shamli district in the state of Uttar Pradesh, India.  the 2011 Census of India, Garhi Pukhta had a population of 11,748. Males constitute 53% of the population and females 47%. Garhi Pukhta has an average literacy rate of 49%; male literacy is 58%, and female literacy is 42%.

Many a families have added values to the glory of this historic town. One of them is "Sharma's" family, whose ancestors Late Mr. Vishnu Dutt Sharma (Indian Freedom Fighter - non co-operation movement) helped the growth of this town. The town has a big bazaar, and in the past nearby villagers used to come at least once to this bazaar on Sunday, which used to be called "Haat". Though nowadays this town has better connectivity by buses to nearby villages and towns, and hence instead of one day's main trading, now the entire week has good trading.

Many of the graduates, engineers, MBAs etc. from this town serve the nation by rendering their services to reputed companies. "Sachin Sharma S/O Mr. Sunder Dutt Sharma" has been main young generation guy in adding values and making it famous even in the current time. He did his masters from IIT New Delhi in 2002 by achieving Golden award. Most of them are educated and have scattered across country flagging its glory and reputation across India and making the people of this town proud.

Dr.Nishant Kaushik S/O Mr sunder dutt sharma has become a role model mainly for Medical aspirants across area as he has been selected for King George's Medical University Lucknow for MBBS course through UPCPMT-2012 and also for MD course through NeetPG in king george medical university lucknow.

Shanky Jain,Shubham Jain,Naman Jain s/o Mitthan Lal Jain made the whole town proud. Shanky Jain successfully running a Cloth business in delhi. Shubham Jain managing a Preventive Health care company-Biocity Health Care in Delhi on the other hand Naman Jain running a well established Coaching Institute in Delhi with the name Brilliant Brain Creators.He has already cracked NET(Eco) exam and has done MA(Eco) and Eco(H) from Delhi University.Naman Jain also received National Scholarship Award and Jain scholarship Award twice for his academic performances.

This town has a good blend of different communities, and there have never been any unwanted disputes amongst them. Most of the population of this town is "Farmer", and each one of them works hard to get better crop out of his fields. It helps all of them to get better livelihood, more ease to their life and raising the living standards. This town has a higher secondary college by the name of "Jawaharlal Nehru College" and a high school which is locally known as "Bees wala school", though officially it is "Lal bahadur Shastari Junior High School".

This town has a post office, two banks, a government school, A girl's college, hospitals for both animals and human beings and many private schools. One of the oldest school has been by the name of "Adarsh Bal Vidya Mandir", This school is one of the oldest in this town and has given many good scholars, who in turn are now highly reputed and good earning either private of government job officers across India.

References

Cities and towns in Shamli district